Saurodektes is an extinct genus of owenettid procolophonoid parareptile known from the earliest Triassic deposits of Eastern Cape Province, South Africa. It was first named by Sean P. Modesto, Ross J. Damiani, Johann Neveling and Adam M. Yates in 2003 and the type species is Saurodectes rogersorum. The generic name Saurodectes was preoccupied by the generic name of Saurodectes vrsanskyi Rasnitsyn & Zherikhin, 2000, a fossil chewing lice known from the Early Cretaceous of Russia. Thus, an alternative generic name, Saurodektes, was proposed by Modesto et al. in 2004. The generic name means "lizard", sauros, and "biter", dektes from Greek. The specific name, rogersorum, honors Richard and Jenny Rogers, owners of the farm Barendskraal, for their hospitality, support and interest in the work of the paleontologists who recovered the holotype. Saurodektes is known solely from the holotype BP/1/6025, a partial skull and some fragmentary partial postcranial elements, housed at the Bernard Price Institute for Palaeontological Research, although the unprepared specimens BP/1/6044, BP/1/6045 and BP/1/6047 might also be referable to it. All specimens were collected on the slopes of the Manhaar Hill at Barendskraal in the Middelburg District, from the Palingkloof Member of the Balfour Formation, Beaufort Group, only 12 metres below the base of the Katberg Formation. This horizon belongs to the Lystrosaurus Assemblage Zone, dating to the early Induan stage of the Early Triassic period.

References

Fossil taxa described in 2003
Fossil taxa described in 2004
Procolophonomorphs
Early Triassic reptiles of Africa
Triassic parareptiles
Prehistoric reptile genera